This is a list of notable Webster University alumni, including both living and deceased individuals.

Notable alumni

 Marvin Abney (b. 1949) – Masters 1982; member of the Rhode Island House of Representatives
 Rich Anderson (b. 1955) – MA 1982; member of the Virginia House of Delegates
 Lloyd James Austin III (b. 1953) – MA 1989; U.S. Secretary of Defense
 Barbara Ballard (b. 1944) – BMeEd 1967; member of the Kansas House of Representatives
 Sheila R. Baxter (b. 1956) – MA 1986; U.S. Army brigadier general; first female general in the Medical Service Corps

 Hunter Bell – BFA 1993 (Conservatory of Theatre Arts); Broadway actor and dramatist
 John Boccieri (b. 1969) – MA 1992, MPA 1996; former U.S. Congressman
 Erin Bode – jazz musician
 Nikki Boyer (b. 1975) – BA 1997; actress, television host, and singer
 Steven A. Boylan (b. 1965) – MA
 Ann Walsh Bradley (b. 1950) – BA 1972; Wisconsin Supreme Court Justice
 Kevin Bratcher
 William Broad – reporter, Pulitzer Prize winner
 Bryan D. Brown – MBA; U.S. Army general and commander of U.S. Special Forces
 Norbert Leo Butz – Tony Award-winning actor

 Kevin P. Byrnes – MA 1985; U.S. Army general 
 Bruce A. Carlson – MA 1980 – U.S. Air Force general
 Rocky Carroll – actor
 Carrol H. Chandler – MA 1978; U.S. Air Force general; 35th Vice Chief of Staff of the United States Air Force
 Chris Cheek
 Eileen Collins – astronaut, U.S. Air Force colonel (retired)
 John B. Conaway
 Adam Jamal Craig – actor

 Joseph V. Cuffari – Inspector General of the Department of Homeland Security
 John Cusick
 Daria Dolan
 Jonathan Dolan

 Debi Doss
 Sam Dotson – former Metropolitan Police Department, City of St. Louis, Police Commissioner St. Louis, Missouri 2013–2017
 Michele Dunaway
 Mary Alice Dwyer-Dobbin – television producer
 Kevin Earley – actor
 Julie Ann Emery – actress
 Nichi Farnham
 Steven E. Foster – U.S. Air National Guard Major General
 Dan Gilvezan
 Olivia Gude – art educator
 Charles Guenther
 Sidney M. Gutierrez – astronaut

 Clarence Harmon – former St Louis Mayor and Police Commissioner St. Louis, Missouri
 Bernie Herpin
 Phyllis Huffman
 Charlie Huggins
 Ramlan Ibrahim – Malaysian diplomat
 Jane Ellen Ibur – poet and arts educator; recipient of the Loretto Award from Webster University
 Kevin J. Jacobsen
 Jennifer Johnson Cano
 Neal Jones
 Timothy J. Kadavy – United States Army Major General; former Adjutant General of the Nebraska National Guard; Director of the Army National Guard
 Matt Kindt – artist and graphic novelist
 R. Alan King
Jodi Kingsley - actress (Chicago Med, NBC)
 Steve Kirby – jazz educator
 Jenifer Lewis – actress
 Dana Loesch
 Kevin J. Manning
 Marsha Mason – actress, Academy Award nominee. 2x Golden Globe award winner.
 Sandra Mansour – fashion designer
 Kathleen Mazzarella
 Imaan Sulaiman-Ibrahim – Director-General of NAPTIP
 Danny McCarthy – Broadway, TV and film actor 
 Ruth McClendon – African-American politician from San Antonio, Texas
 Craig R. McKinley – MA 1979; U.S. Air Force general
 Patricia McKissack – author of children's literature
 Allen Meadors

 Jerry Mitchell – actor, Tony Award winner
 Joe Mokwa – Former Metropolitan Police Department, City of St. Louis Police Commissioner, St. Louis, Missouri, 2001–2008 
 Keith W. Nolan – Vietnam War historian
 Richard Ojeda - Bronze Star awardee, United States Army veteran of Afghan and Iraq conflicts, West Virginia senator
 Vance Peterson – judge
 Tony Richardson – NFL football player
 Rob Riggle – actor, The Daily Show and Saturday Night Live
 Ray Robson – chess player and Grandmaster
 Eric Rosen - chess player and International Master
 Roderick Royal – Mayor of Birmingham, Alabama
 Jeffrey D. Sams – actor

 Eric Schaefer – author and professor at Emerson College
 Sister Lory Schaff – leader in adult literacy education
 Steven A. Schaick – U.S. Air Force general, Deputy Chief of Chaplains
 Winfield W. Scott III – MA 1983; U.S. Air Force general
 Phil Short – member of the Louisiana State Senate (1996–99)
 Lara Smith - Managing Director, Dad's Garage Theatre Company in Atlanta, GA
 Tammy Smith – first openly gay flag officer in the U.S. Army
 Dana Snyder – actor
 Gary D. Speer – MA 1982, U.S. Army lieutenant general
 Antonio Taguba – U.S. Army general
 Roelof van Laar – MBA 2014; Dutch politician, member of the Labour Party
 Mark A. Welsh – Chief of Staff, U.S. Air Force
 Donald C. Wurster – MA 1983; U.S. Air Force general
 James C. Yarbrough – MA 1991; U.S. Army general
 Kristeen Young – musical performer, pianist
 Susilo Bambang Yudhoyono – MA 2004; former president of Indonesia
 John Zorn – attended two years; jazz musician

References

Webster University